The Real Democracy Movement of New Zealand was a short-lived political movement in New Zealand founded in 1942.
  
The movement's aims, as stated at the first annual conference, held at Lower Hutt on 22 January 1943, was for “economic security combined with individual liberty”, and advocated that all returned servicemen should be paid at least the average wage until they were re-integrated into civil employment.

The movement received only 4,421 votes (0.53%, on provisional count of votes).

In a post-election letter, F. Allen (a North Island executive member) stated that the movement wanted fewer controls except that "the people should control money or credit policy, something vastly different from what obtains at present"; and objected to the movement being called a party.

Roly Marks, another North Island executive member, later stood several times for  Social Credit. Like nearly half the executive, he was a returned soldier from World War I.

References 

Defunct political parties in New Zealand
Political parties established in 1942
1942 establishments in New Zealand
Social credit parties